"No Me Digas Que No" (English: "Don't Say No To Me") is a song by American duo Xtreme with American singer Adrienne Bailon. It served as a single for the 2007 Platinum Edition of their second album, Haciendo Historia (2006).

Charts

Weekly charts

Year-end charts

References

2007 songs
2007 singles
Xtreme (group) songs